Brendan Gleeson is an Irish actor known for his performances in television and film.

He has received various awards including a Primetime Emmy Award for Outstanding Lead Actor in a Limited Series or Movie for his role as Winston Churchill in the HBO film Into the Storm (2009). He has also received nominations for two BAFTA Awards (In Bruges (2008), and Into the Storm (2009) and five Golden Globe Awards (In Bruges (2008), Into the Storm (2009), The Guard (2011), The Comey Rule (2020), and The Banshees of Inisherin (2022).

Major associations

Academy Awards

BAFTA Awards

Emmy Awards

Golden Globe Awards

Screen Actors Guild Awards

Miscellaneous awards

British Independent Film Award

Irish Film & Television Awards

National Society of Film Critics

Satellite Awards

Critics awards

Detroit Film Critics Society

National Board of Review

San Diego Film Critics Society

References

External links
 

Gleeson, Brendan